Serkovsky is a rural locality (a khutor) in Krasnyaynskoye Rural Settlement, Uryupinsky District, Volgograd Oblast, Russia. The population was 120 as of 2010.

Geography 
The village is located in steppe, 21 km from Uryupinsk and 350 km from Volgograd.

References 

Rural localities in Uryupinsky District